The Canopus Rocks are two small, low rocks lying  northwest of Canopus Island,  east of Nella Rock and the Sawert Rocks, and  southeast of Hansen Rocks in the eastern part of Holme Bay, Mac. Robertson Land. They were plotted from photos taken from Australian National Antarctic Research Expeditions aircraft in 1958, and named by the Antarctic Names Committee of Australia after Canopus Island.

References 

Rock formations of Mac. Robertson Land